Polykleitos ("much-renowned", traditionally Latinized Polycletus) is a Greek male forename. 

It is also transliterated Polycleitus;  and due to iotacism in the transition from Ancient to Modern Greek, Polyklitos or Polyclitus. Polykleitos and its variants can refer to:

People
Polykleitos of Argos - Ancient Greek sculptor, creator of the Canon, also called Polykleitos the Elder to distinguish him from his son, below
 Polykleitos the Younger - his son, and Ancient Greek architect
Polykleitos of Sicyon - another Greek sculptor sometimes conflated with Polykleitos the Elder
 Polyclitus (freedman) - freedman of the Roman emperor Nero

Places
Odos Polykleitou - lit. "The Street of Polykleitos"; Polykleitos Street in modern Athens, named for Polykleitos the Elder, above